Zhejiang Free-Trade zone, officially China (Zhejiang) Pilot Free-Trade Zone is a free-trade zone in Zhoushan, Zhejiang Province, China.

Established in 2014, the FTZ primarily focuses on trade of bulk commodity in eastern China, such as petroleum and oil products.

References

Zhoushan